The 1992–93 Southampton F.C. season was the club's first season in the Premier League, and their 23rd season in the top division of English football. As co-founders of the Premier League, the club looked to retain their status as one of the top clubs in the country by ensuring a 16th consecutive season in the top flight. Southampton finished 18th in the league, just one point above the relegation zone – their worst top division finish since their relegation in 1974. They also reached the third round of the FA Cup and the League Cup.

Southampton were relatively inactive in the 1992 summer transfer window, making only three purchases before the start of the season – striker Kerry Dixon for £575,000 and defender Ken Monkou for £750,000, from Chelsea and winger Perry Groves from Arsenal. A number of players were sold by the club, most notably striker Alan Shearer who moved to Blackburn Rovers in July for a British transfer fee record of £3.6 million, with David Speedie moving the other way as part of the deal. Later in the year, Frankie Bennett and Derek Allan were brought into the club, both for nominal fees, while David Lee was sold to Bolton Wanderers and new arrival Dixon left on a free transfer for Luton Town.

At the end of the season Southampton finished 18th in the Premier League table with 13 wins, 11 draws and 18 losses, just two positions and one point above the relegation zone. Matthew Le Tissier was the club's top scorer, with 15 goals in the league and 18 in all competitions. Goalkeeper Tim Flowers was named Southampton Player of the Season, becoming only the second player (after Peter Shilton) to win the award twice (and twice in a row). At the end of the season, strikers Perry Groves and David Speedie were released from the club. It was also the last full season for Flowers, who left the club in November 1993, as well as Glenn Cockerill who departed the club in December 1993.

FA Premier League
Southampton's first season in the newly formed Premier League did not get off to a positive start, as the club won only two of their first ten games, overcoming Middlesbrough and Coventry late to win 2–1 on both occasions. Between 31 October and 12 December 1992 the team progressed up the table as they went unbeaten for six games, including wins against Oldham Athletic, Nottingham Forest, and Arsenal. Over the Christmas period Southampton were less fortunate, losing three out of four of their matches in late December and early January and dropping back down to the relegation zone as a result.

Throughout the rest of January, February and March though, Southampton were one of the more consistent sides in the league, winning a total of seven matches out of 11. Wins included a comfortable 3–0 against Norwich City (their best result of the season), a 2–1 edging of Liverpool at home, and a dramatic 4–3 triumph over Ipswich Town in which Matthew Le Tissier scored a last-minute goal to claim the three points for the home side. One of their losses, 2–4 against Tottenham Hotspur, saw the Saints sacrifice a 1–0 lead to concede four goals from the hosts in a single five-minute period, with a consolation goal scored by Richard Hall later on. During this period, the Hampshire side made it to a peak of ninth in the table.

After three losses in a row though, Southampton were again struggling to regain a respectable position in the league table, although did pick up a 1–0 win over Chelsea late in the campaign. The final run of games started with a disappointing 2–5 loss to Sheffield Wednesday, followed by a goalless draw with Everton and frustrating losses against Manchester City and Oldham Athletic. Despite the team losing 3–4 in the final match of the season, Le Tissier established himself as a key part of the Saints side when he scored a hat-trick at Oldham to bring his league tally up to 15.

FA Cup
As a Premier League club, Southampton entered the 1992–93 FA Cup in the Third Round. They were drawn against Nottingham Forest, who defeated the Saints at the City Ground 2–1 with goals from Roy Keane and Neil Webb (Matthew Le Tissier scoring for Southampton).

League Cup
As a Premier League club, Southampton entered the 1992–93 Football League Cup in the Second Round. They were drawn against Gillingham, with whom they shared a goalless draw in the first leg, before winning comfortably 3–0 in the second. In the Third Round they faced Crystal Palace at home, but were beaten 0–2 thanks to goals from Eddie McGoldrick and John Salako.

Squad statistics

Most appearances

Top goalscorers

Transfers

References

Southampton F.C. seasons
Southampton